Jean-Pierre Sarrazac (born 1946) is a French playwright, stage director, drama trainer and university teacher. In his works he has been influenced by Bernard Dort. He has published several studies and books on drama and dramaturgy. He directed several plays by playwrights Valère Novarina, Strindberg, von Saaz and himself. Jean-Pierre Sarrazac is an emeritus professor of theatre studies at the University of Paris III: Sorbonne Nouvelle and invited professor at the Université catholique de Louvain (Belgium).

Works

Plays
 1976 : Lazare lui aussi rêvait d'eldorado
 1985 : L'Enfant-roi (The Kid King)
 1989 : Les Inséparables (The Unbreakables)
 1989 : La Passion du jardinier (The Gardener's Passion)
 1993 : Harriet
 1996 : La Fugitive (The Fugitive)
 2003 : Cantiga para jà, Place de la Révolution (co-written with Christina Mirjol)

Essays
 1981 : L'Avenir du drame
 1989 : Théâtres intimes (Intimate Theatres)
 1995 : Théâtres du moi, théâtres du monde (Theatres Of Me, Theatres Of The World)
 2000 : Critique du théâtre. De l'utopie au désenchantement (The Theater Critic, The Disenchantment Utopia)
 2004 : Jeux de rêves et autres détours

References 

Living people
1946 births
Academic staff of Sorbonne Nouvelle University Paris 3
French theatre directors
20th-century French dramatists and playwrights
21st-century French dramatists and playwrights